Campbell County is a county in the U.S. state of Wyoming. As of the 2020 United States Census, the population was 47,026, making it the third-most populous county in Wyoming. Its county seat is Gillette.

Campbell County comprises the Gillette, WY Micropolitan Statistical Area.

History
Campbell County was created in 1911 from land annexed from Crook and Weston Counties. It was named either for John Allen Campbell, a governor of the Wyoming Territory, or for Robert Campbell, a trapper and fur trader associated with William Henry Ashley.

Geography

Adjacent counties

 Powder River County, Montana – north
 Crook County – northeast
 Weston County – southeast
 Converse County – south
 Johnson County – southwest
 Sheridan County – west

Major highways
  Interstate 90

  U.S. Highway 14
  U.S. Highway 16
  Wyoming Highway 50
  Wyoming Highway 51
  Wyoming Highway 59
  Wyoming Highway 387
  Wyoming Highway 450

National protected area
Thunder Basin National Grassland (part)

Demographics

2000 census
As of the 2000 United States Census, there were 33,698 people, 12,207 households, and 9,008 families in the county. The population density was 7 people per square mile (3/km2). There were 13,288 housing units at an average density of 3 per square mile (1/km2). The racial makeup of the county was 96.06% White, 0.15% Black or African American, 0.93% Native American, 0.32% Asian, 0.09% Pacific Islander, 1.12% from other races, and 1.34% from two or more races. 3.53% of the population were Hispanic or Latino of any race. 30.3% were of German, 11.4% English, 11.0% Irish, 8.5% American and 6.2% Norwegian ancestry.

There were 12,207 households, out of which 43.10% had children under the age of 18 living with them, 59.80% were married couples living together, 8.80% had a female householder with no husband present, and 26.20% were non-families. Of 12,207 households, 785 were unmarried partner households: 675 heterosexual, 52 same-sex male, and 58 same-sex female.

20.20% of all households were made up of individuals, and 3.90% had someone living alone who was 65 years of age or older.  The average household size was 2.73 and the average family size was 3.16.

The county population contained 31.00% under the age of 18, 9.50% from 18 to 24, 32.30% from 25 to 44, 21.90% from 45 to 64, and 5.30% who were 65 years of age or older. The median age was 32 years. For every 100 females there were 105.60 males. For every 100 females age 18 and over, there were 104.10 males.

The median income for a household in the county was $76,576, and the median income for a family was $53,927. Males had a median income of $41,814 versus $21,914 for females. The per capita income for the county was $20,063. About 5.60% of families and 7.60% of the population were below the poverty line, including 7.70% of those under age 18 and 12.40% of those age 65 or over.

2010 census
As of the 2010 United States Census, there were 46,133 people, 17,172 households, and 11,933 families in the county. The racial makeup of the county was 93.2% white, 1.2% American Indian, 0.6% Asian, 0.3% black or African American, 2.7% from other races, and 2.1% from two or more races. Those of Hispanic or Latino origin made up 7.8% of the population. In terms of ancestry, 32.2% were German, 15.9% were Irish, 10.8% were English, 5.5% were American, and 5.1% were Norwegian.

Of the 17,172 households, 39.0% had children under the age of 18 living with them, 54.0% were married couples living together, 8.6% had a female householder with no husband present, 30.5% were non-families, and 22.4% of all households were made up of individuals. The average household size was 2.66 and the average family size was 3.11. The median age was 31.9 years.

The median income for a household in the county was $76,576 and the median income for a family was $83,965. Males had a median income of $61,393 versus $31,769 for females. The per capita income for the county was $31,968. About 5.9% of families and 6.9% of the population were below the poverty line, including 10.5% of those under age 18 and 3.9% of those age 65 or over.

Communities

City

 Gillette (county seat)

Town
 Wright

Census-designated places
 Antelope Valley-Crestview
 Sleepy Hollow

Unincorporated communities

Croton
Echeta
Pleastantdale
Recluse
Rozet
Savageton
Spotted Horse
Weston
Wyodak

Politics 
Campbell County is overwhelmingly Republican. No Democratic presidential candidate has carried Campbell County since Franklin D. Roosevelt won 46 of 48 contemporary states against Alf Landon in 1936. Since 1950, the only Democrat to have won forty percent of the county's vote is Lyndon Johnson in his 1964 landslide victory against Barry Goldwater, and in the subsequent half-century no Democrat has passed one-third of the county's vote. In 2016, indeed, Campbell came to rival Crook and Johnson counties for the unofficial title of “reddest county in the reddest state”, with Donald Trump outpolling Hillary Clinton by a twelve-to-one margin. It is the only county in the state where Trump got >85% of the vote.

Notable people
Tom Lubnau, Speaker of the Wyoming House of Representatives
Sue Wallis, Republican member of the Wyoming House from Campbell County

See also
National Register of Historic Places listings in Campbell County, Wyoming
Wyoming
List of cities and towns in Wyoming
List of counties in Wyoming
Wyoming statistical areas

References

External links
Campbell County Website
 Campbell County Observer Website

 
1911 establishments in Wyoming
Populated places established in 1911